The North Queensland Broomball Association (NQBA) is the governing body for broomball in north Queensland, Australia.  It is based in the city of Townsville and is a founding member of the national body, Broomball Australia.

The NQBA is a not-for-profit organisation that was formed in 1992, the third incorporated broomball club in Australia after the Broomball Association of South Australia and Australian Capital Territory Broomball Association.  Broomball had been played in Townsville since the late 1980s.

As at August 2006 the club has around 120 members, both male and female, ranging in age from 8 to 70.  Three divisions are played in local competition: A Grade (elite), B Grade (intermediate), and C Grade (social, beginners and juniors).  Training sessions are also run from time to time.

All local competition games are played at the Warrina Ice Rink in the Townsville suburb of Currajong.

The organisation is run by an Executive Committee consisting of seven members.  All administrators and officials within the association are also current players.

The NQBA represents the state of Queensland at the annual Australian National Broomball Championships; the state representative squad is the Queensland Cyclones.

Seasons 
As of 2006, the NQBA runs two playing seasons per year, called the Summer and Winter seasons.  The summer season generally runs between January to June, while the winter season operates between July and December.

Champions 
Each season there is a round robin competition, where every team in each division plays against each other an equal number of times.  At the end of the round robin season, the final standings are used to determine those teams that qualify for the play-offs (or finals).  The winners of the play-offs are crowned champions.

References

External links
 North Queensland Broomball Association official website

Sports governing bodies in Queensland

Sport in Townsville
Broomball in Australia